Tongod is the capital of the Tongod District in the Sandakan Division of Sabah, Malaysia.

Climate
Tongod has a tropical rainforest climate (Af) with heavy rainfall year-round.

References

External links 

Tongod District
Towns in Sabah